The tallest buildings in Omaha, Nebraska  include towers for Woodmen of the World and the First National Bank of Omaha. While most of the city's tallest buildings are located in Downtown Omaha, several are located in Midtown Omaha. The University of Nebraska Medical Center is located in midtown and among its rapidly expanding campus is the  Lied Transplant Center. Additionally, TD Ameritrade has its , 12-story headquarters in Old Mill.

As of April 2022, Mutual of Omaha announced they would build their new headquarters in downtown Omaha on the site of the W. Dale Clark Library. The tower will be 44 stories and 677 feet, making it the new tallest building in Omaha. The Omaha City Council approved the new tower in May 2022 and construction began on January 25, 2023.

Tallest habitable buildings

Tallest buildings: site prep or under construction

Approved and current proposals

Cancelled

Timeline of tallest buildings

The following is a list of buildings that were once the tallest structure in Omaha.

See also 
 Architecture in Omaha, Nebraska
 Downtown Omaha
 Tourism in Omaha, Nebraska

References

Omaha
Buildings

Tallest